Cody Henson is an American politician who served in the North Carolina House of Representatives representing the 113th district (including constituents in Henderson, Polk, and Transylvania counties) from January 2017 until his resignation on July 24, 2019, following his pleading guilty to cyberstalking in a domestic violence case.

Career
Henson was elected to the North Carolina House of Representatives in 2016 to succeed Chris Whitmire, who wasn't seeking re-election. He was re-elected to the seat in 2018. Henson pleaded guilty to cyberstalking on July 23, 2019 as part of a plea deal to receive loser sentencing he was sentenced to 18 months probation. Henson who had already announced that he wouldn't seek re-election in 2020 originally said he would finish his term in the NC House, but resigned the next day. Polk County Commissioner Jake Johnson was appointed to Henson's seat on August 6, 2019 to fill the remainder of the term and he was elected to a full term in 2020.

Electoral history

2018

2016

Committee assignments

2019 Session
Wildlife Resources (Chair)
Homeland Security, Military, and Veterans Affairs (Vice Chair)
Education - K-12
Finance
Regulatory Reform
Insurance

2017-2018 Session
Wildlife Resources
Homeland Security, Military, and Veterans Affairs
Education - K-12
Finance
Regulatory Reform

References

Living people
People from Transylvania County, North Carolina
Republican Party members of the North Carolina House of Representatives
21st-century American politicians
Year of birth missing (living people)
North Carolina politicians convicted of crimes